Getta tica is a moth of the  family Notodontidae. It is found in Panama and Costa Rica.

Larvae have been reared on Passiflora tica.

External links
Species page at Tree of Life project

Notodontidae
Moths described in 2009